Antonio "Toni" Moya Vega (born 20 March 1998) is a Spanish professional footballer who plays as a central midfielder for Deportivo Alavés.

Career
Born in Mérida, Badajoz, Extremadura, but raised in Son Servera, Majorca, Balearic Islands, Moya joined Atlético Madrid's youth setup in 2013 at the age of 15, from RCD Mallorca. He made his senior debut with the reserves on 16 October 2016, starting in a 2–0 Tercera División home win against Internacional de Madrid CF.

Moya scored his first senior goal on 18 December 2016, netting his team's second in a 3–2 away win against Villaverde San Andrés. He contributed with 19 appearances during the campaign, as his side returned to Segunda División B after a two-year absence.

Moya made his first team debut on 25 October 2017, coming on as a second-half substitute for Keidi Bare in a 1–1 away draw against Elche CF, for the season's Copa del Rey. His La Liga debut came the following 1 April, replacing Thomas Partey in a 1–0 home win against Deportivo de La Coruña.

On 1 June 2021, Moya signed a two-year contract with Deportivo Alavés in the top tier.

Career statistics

Club

References

External links

1998 births
Living people
People from Mérida, Spain
Sportspeople from the Province of Badajoz
People from Son Servera
Footballers from Extremadura
Footballers from Mallorca
Spanish footballers
Association football midfielders
La Liga players
Segunda División B players
Tercera División players
Atlético Madrid B players
Atlético Madrid footballers
Deportivo Alavés players
Spain youth international footballers